Milan Minić (1889–1961) was a Serbian architect and painter.

He was founder and first president of The Applied Artists and Designers Association of Serbia" (ULUPUDS) in 1953.

Notable works
His works include:
 The building facade in Belgrade, Čika Ljubina 5
 hotels: Zeleni Venac in Šabac and Majestic in Belgrade
 Majdanpek House of Culture
 Reconstruction and adaptation of the Old Palace in Belgrade for use of the Presidium of the FPR Yugoslavia National Assembly and the New Palace in Belgrade for the Government presidency of the PR Serbia
 Completion, adaptation and interior decoration of the House of the National Assembly of Serbia
 Refurbishment of the Writers Club in Francuska Street 7, Belgrade and the Topčider House of Troops.
 Šabac City Market Building

See also
 List of painters from Serbia

References

1889 births
1961 deaths
People from Prijepolje
Serbian architects
Serbian painters
Serbian people of World War I